The 2019–20 Liga IV Hunedoara was the 52nd season of the Liga IV Hunedoara, the fourth tier of the Romanian football league system. The season began on 17 August 2019 and was scheduled to end in June 2020, but was suspended in March because of the COVID-19 pandemic in Romania. 

The season was ended officially on 14 July 2020 after AJF Hunedoara (County Football Association) concluding that the teams could not meet the medical conditions for matches at this level. Jiul Petroșani was crowned as county champion.

Competition format
The 12 teams will play a regular season, followed by a play-off and play-out. The regular season is a double round-robin tournament. At the end of the regular season, the first six teams will play a championship play-off and the  last five teams  will play a relegation play-out.

Team changes

To Liga IV Hunedoara
Relegated from Liga III
 —Promoted from Liga V Hunedoara —

From Liga IV HunedoaraPromoted to Liga III —Relegated to Liga V Hunedoara'''
 —

Other changes
 Universitatea Petroșani did not inscribe in Liga IV.

League table

Promotion play-off

Champions of Liga IV – Hunedoara County face champions of Liga IV – Mehedinți County and Liga IV – Timiș County.

Region 4 (West)

Group B

See also

Main Leagues
 2019–20 Liga I
 2019–20 Liga II
 2019–20 Liga III
 2019–20 Liga IV

County Leagues (Liga IV series)

 2019–20 Liga IV Alba
 2019–20 Liga IV Arad
 2019–20 Liga IV Argeș
 2019–20 Liga IV Bacău
 2019–20 Liga IV Bihor
 2019–20 Liga IV Bistrița-Năsăud
 2019–20 Liga IV Botoșani
 2019–20 Liga IV Brăila
 2019–20 Liga IV Brașov
 2019–20 Liga IV Bucharest
 2019–20 Liga IV Buzău
 2019–20 Liga IV Călărași
 2019–20 Liga IV Caraș-Severin
 2019–20 Liga IV Cluj
 2019–20 Liga IV Constanța
 2019–20 Liga IV Covasna
 2019–20 Liga IV Dâmbovița
 2019–20 Liga IV Dolj 
 2019–20 Liga IV Galați
 2019–20 Liga IV Giurgiu
 2019–20 Liga IV Gorj
 2019–20 Liga IV Harghita
 2019–20 Liga IV Ialomița
 2019–20 Liga IV Iași
 2019–20 Liga IV Ilfov
 2019–20 Liga IV Maramureș
 2019–20 Liga IV Mehedinți
 2019–20 Liga IV Mureș
 2019–20 Liga IV Neamț
 2019–20 Liga IV Olt
 2019–20 Liga IV Prahova
 2019–20 Liga IV Sălaj
 2019–20 Liga IV Satu Mare
 2019–20 Liga IV Sibiu
 2019–20 Liga IV Suceava
 2019–20 Liga IV Teleorman
 2019–20 Liga IV Timiș
 2019–20 Liga IV Tulcea
 2019–20 Liga IV Vâlcea
 2019–20 Liga IV Vaslui
 2019–20 Liga IV Vrancea

References

External links
 Official website

Liga IV seasons
Sport in Hunedoara County